1st Guards Division may refer to:
 1st Guards Division (Imperial Japanese Army)
 1st Guards Infantry Division (German Empire)
 1st Guards Infantry Division (Russian Empire)